Lana is a genus of foraminifera described in 1977 belonging to the family Komokiidae. It contains three species.

References

Foraminifera genera
Monothalamea